Dejan Pešić (Serbian Cyrillic: Дејан Пешић; born December 16, 1976) is a Serbian former football goalkeeper.

Honours
Red Star Belgrade
First League of FR Yugoslavia (2): 1999–00, 2000–01
FR Yugoslavia Cup (2): 1999–00, 2001–02

References

External sources
 
 

1976 births
Living people
People from Vlasotince
Serbian footballers
Serbian expatriate footballers
FK Sloga Doboj players
FK Radnički Niš players
Red Star Belgrade footballers
FK Spartak Subotica players
FC Brașov (1936) players
FC Vaslui players
Shahin Bushehr F.C. players
Gol Gohar players
Expatriate footballers in Iran
Expatriate footballers in Romania
Liga I players
Association football goalkeepers